Teufelsbach is a small river of North Rhine-Westphalia, Germany.

The Teufelsbach is situated in the Beuel district of Bonn.  It is a left tributary of the Alaunbach.

See also
 List of rivers of North Rhine-Westphalia

References

Rivers of North Rhine-Westphalia
Rivers of Germany